Junctional adhesion molecule C is a protein that in humans is encoded by the JAM3 gene.

Gene 

This gene is located on the long arm of chromosome 11 (11q25) on the Watson strand. It is 83,077 bases in length. The encoded protein is 310 amino acids long with a predicted molecular weight of 35.02 kiloDaltons.

Function 

Tight junctions represent one mode of cell-to-cell adhesion in epithelial or endothelial cell sheets, forming continuous seals around cells and serving as a physical barrier to prevent solutes and water from passing freely through the paracellular space. The protein encoded by this immunoglobulin superfamily gene member is localized in the tight junctions between high endothelial cells. Unlike other proteins in this family, this protein is unable to adhere to leukocyte cell lines and only forms weak homotypic interactions. The encoded protein is a member of the junctional adhesion molecule protein family and acts as a receptor for another member of this family.

Interactions

JAM3 has been shown to interact with PARD3.

Clinical significance 

Loss-of-function mutations in this gene cause a rare syndrome - autosomal recessive hemorrhagic destruction of the brain, subependymal calcification and congenital cataracts.

References

Further reading